Sriperumbudur taluk is a taluk of Kanchipuram district of the Indian state of Tamil Nadu. The headquarters of the taluk is the town of Sriperumbudur.

Demographics
According to the 2011 census, the taluk of Sriperumbudur had a population of 486,063 with 246,416  males and 239,647 females. There were 973 women for every 1000 men. The taluk had a literacy rate of 74.56. Child population in the age group below 6 was 25,962 Males and 24,980 Females.

References 

Taluks of Kanchipuram district